V900 or variation, may refer to:

 E-TEN V900, a Pocket PC phone
 LG V900, an LG mobile phone
 Bravia Chaimite V-900 armoured recovery vehicle

See also

 V90 (disambiguation)